Senzo “Mazingiza” Mbatha (born 11 May 1979), nicknamed "Senzo “ is a South African Sports Executive. He was popularly known by his mother’s surname Mazingiza which was later changed to his father’s surname Mbatha. He's a former Chief Executive Officer of both Yanga S.C. and Simba Sports Club in Tanzania. He also established himself extensively in South Africa where he was an Administrative Manager and Orlando Pirates FC and General Manager at Platinum Stars, Bay United FC and University of Pretoria FC .Mbatha has been involved in several clubs and international sporting events and most notably the FIFA Confederations Cup 2009 and FIFA World Cup 2010 as its Deputy Tournament Director. Mbatha has vast experience in the CAF Inter-club competitions the experience in understanding the requirements of the continental football.

Football career 
In 2010, Holder his football administration qualifications he then drives Premier soccer League (South Africa) as A Project Manager. After being General manager of the professional team of the University of Pretoria Football Club (South Africa), he joined the professional staff of PSL ticketing and security Committee in Premier League (South Africa) .In 2011,  In 2017, he became the CAF 2017 Symposium delegate Director, also in 2017,he was selected as a general manager at Platinum stars Football club, the African participate in three CAN (African Cup of Nations) successive, a real performance for the country in South Africa.

In 2010, he was selected to join the 2010 FIFA team and became deputy tournament director in 2010 FIFA World Cup Organizing Committee.

Simba S.C. and Yanga S.C. 
In 2019 Mbatha became the Chief Executive Officer (CEO) of Simba S.C., the 2017/18,2018/19 and 2019/20 champions of the Tanzanian Premier League. The Tanzanian giants were ambitious and wanted to become one of the top 5 club teams in Africa. The South African Sports Administrator was hired to bring his experience in continental competitions and targeted winning the Champions League and International League (CAF). Mbatha guided Simba S.C. to the Tanzanian Premier League title in 2019/20 and reached the finals of the African Champions League.  Mbatha resigned to continue as a CEO of Simba S.C and join with Yanga S.C, another soccer giants in Tanzania.

Career 
 2010 FIFA World Cup (2009–2010)
 Premier Soccer League (2010–2012)
 Orlando Pirates F.C. (2011–2013) 
 CAF 2017 (2017–2017) 
 Simba Sports Club (2019 - 2020)
 Yanga S.C. (2020–present)

References

External links 
 Facebook

1979 births
Living people
Soccer people in South Africa